The 2017–18 WPBL season was the 27th season of the Russian Women's Basketball Premier League. UMMC Ekaterinburg were the defending champions.

Regular season

Placement round

Playoffs

References

External links
 WPBL Official Website (in Russian)

201718
2017–18 in Russian basketball
Russia